F. Richard Stephenson (born Francis Richard Stephenson, 26 April 1941) is an Emeritus Professor  at the University of Durham, in the  Physics department and the East Asian Studies department.  His research concentrates on historical aspects of astronomy, in particular analyzing ancient astronomical records to reconstruct the history of Earth's rotation.  He has an asteroid named after him: 10979 Fristephenson.

Bibliography 

  & F. Richard Stephenson, The Historical supernovae, Pergamon Press, Oxford, 1977, 233 pages, 
 F. Richard Stephenson & David H. Clark, Applications of Early Astronomical Records, Oxford University Press, 1979, 124 pages, 
 Hermann Hunger, Christopher B. F. Walker, Richard Stephenson & Kevin K. C. Yau, Halley's Comet in History, British Museum Press, 1985, 64 pages, 
 F. Richard Stephenson, Supplement to the Tuckerman Tables, American Philosophical Society, 1986, 564 pages, 
 F. Richard Stephenson & M. A. Houlden, Atlas of historical eclipse maps. East Asia 1500 BC-AD 1900, Cambridge University Press, 1986, 
 F. Richard Stephenson, "The identification of early returns of comet Halley from ancient astronomical records", p. 203 - 214 in Comet Halley. Investigations, results, interpretations, Vol. 2, Prentice Hall, 1990
 F. Richard Stephenson, Astronomical Observations from the Ancient Orient, Prentice Hall, 1990, 350 pages, 
 F. Richard Stephenson, Historical Eclipses and Earth's Rotation, Cambridge University Press, 1997, 573 pages, 
 F. Richard Stephenson & David A. Green, Historical supernovae and their remnants, Oxford, Oxford University Press, 2002, 252 p.,

External links
 Profile from the Durham University Department of Physics.
 Research abstract from the Durham University East Asian Studies Department.
 2014 Doggett Prize Winner - F. Richard Stephenson
 Publications by F. R. Stephenson in the Astrophysics Data System

20th-century British astronomers
Academics of Durham University
Living people
1941 births